Principality of Eğil (also known as Emirate of Eğil, around 1049–1864) was a Kurdish principality or emirate around the town of Eğil founded by Pir Mansûr (b.989) who conquered the town around 1049. Pir Mansûr claimed to be a descendant of Prophet Mohammed and settled in the area from Hakkâri (around Sinjar Mountains) in 1049. The descendants of Pir Mansûr would rule Eğil for nearly eight centuries. During the rule of Emir Muhammed, the principality had expanded southward to Karaca Dağ, Palu and Elazığ northward, Çermik to the west and the area between Hani and Lice to the east.

History
During the reign of the Marwanids, Kurds from the Humeydiye, Beşneviye and Zuzaniye tribes settled in Eğil changing the composition of the area to the detriment of the Armenian, Greek, and Syriac-speaking population. It was during this period that Pir Mansûr settled in the town of Dicle which was populated by Kurds of the Mirdesan tribe. Pir Mansûr ultimately became their leader due to their admiration of him. Pir Mansûr would also become a murshid, a status his son and successor retained. It was during the next two rulers – Pir Musa, son of Pir Mansûr and his grandson Pir Bedir, that the Principality of Eğil was established. This is attributed to the support received from various tribes including the Mirdesan and their leadership on Sufism.

However the rule of Pir Bedir was short since he got killed during the Seljuk siege of the territory in 1087. He was succeeded by his son Emir Bulduk who was birthed after the death of Pir Bedir in exile. The mother of Bulduk died after giving birth and he was raised by the Mirdesan tribe. By the time the Emir of Eğil was Ibrahim the Mirdesan abandoned the title "Pir" for "Emir". After the death of Emir Ibrahim, the principality was shared between his three sons.

The principality and Aq Qoyunlu had friendly relations. The principality was subsequently captured by the Safavids, which then lost it to Selim I. The Ottomans allowed the locals of the principality to govern themselves and would not interfere and it was exempted from the timar system. However, when the Ottomans began losing land on the Balkan peninsula, it started recruiting men from Eğil ultimately ending its special status. In 1864, all of its privileges were abolished and the emirate dissolved.

See also
Sheikh Said rebellion

Notes

Bibliography

Further reading

States and territories established in the 1040s
Former Kurdish states in Turkey
History of Diyarbakır Province
History of Elazığ Province
History of the Kurdish people
Religion in Kurdistan
States and territories disestablished in 1864
Vassal states of the Ottoman Empire